Wólka Grodziska may refer to:

Wólka Grodziska, Masovian Voivodeship, Poland
Wólka Grodziska, Subcarpathian Voivodeship, Poland